Allophylus chirindensis is a species of plant in the family Sapindaceae. It is found in Mozambique and Zimbabwe. It is threatened by habitat loss.

References

chirindensis
Vulnerable plants
Taxonomy articles created by Polbot